This is a list of diplomatic missions of South Africa. South Africa dramatically expanded its diplomatic presence globally, especially in Africa, in the immediate years after the end of apartheid. It was the only country to have embassies in the various bantustan states of Transkei, Venda, Bophuthatswana and Ciskei that South Africa established. It was one of the few countries to recognise Taiwan as the Republic of China, only establishing diplomatic relations with the People's Republic of China in 1998.

Africa

 Algiers (Embassy)

 Luanda (Embassy)

 Cotonou (Embassy)

 Gaborone (High Commission)

 Ouagadougou (Embassy)

 Bujumbura (Embassy)

 Yaoundé (High Commission)

 Bangui (Embassy)

 N'Djamena (Embassy)

 Moroni (Embassy)

 Brazzaville (Embassy)

 Kinshasa (Embassy)
 Lubumbashi (Consulate-General)

 Cairo (Embassy)

 Malabo (Embassy)

 Asmera (Embassy)

 Mbabane (High Commission)

 Addis Ababa (Embassy)

 Libreville (Embassy)

 Accra (High Commission)

 Conakry (Embassy)

 Bissau (Embassy)

 Abidjan (Embassy)

 Nairobi (High Commission)

 Maseru (High Commission)

 Monrovia (Embassy)

 Antananarivo (Embassy)

 Lilongwe (High Commission)

 Bamako (Embassy)

 Nouakchott (Embassy)

 Port Louis (High Commission)

 Rabat (Embassy)

 Maputo (High Commission)

 Windhoek (High Commission)

 Niamey (Embassy)

 Abuja (High Commission)
 Lagos (Deputy High Commission)

 Kigali (High Commission)

 São Tomé (Embassy)

 Dakar (Embassy)

 Juba (Embassy)

 Khartoum (Embassy)

 Dar es Salaam (High Commission)

 Tunis (Embassy)

 Kampala (High Commission)

 Lusaka (High Commission)

 Harare (Embassy)

Americas

 Buenos Aires (Embassy)

 Brasília (Embassy)
 São Paulo (Consulate-General)

 Ottawa (High Commission)
 Toronto (Consulate-General)

 Santiago (Embassy)

 Havana (Embassy)

 Kingston (High Commission)

 Mexico City (Embassy)

 Washington, D.C. (Embassy)
 Los Angeles (Consulate-General)
 New York City (Consulate-General)

 Caracas (Embassy)

Asia

 Beijing (Embassy)
 Hong Kong (Consulate-General)
 Shanghai (Consulate-General)

 New Delhi (High Commission)
 Mumbai (Consulate-General)

 Jakarta (Embassy)

 Tehran (Embassy)

 Tel Aviv (Liaison office)

 Tokyo (Embassy)

 Amman (Embassy)

 Astana (Embassy)

 Kuwait City (Embassy)

 Kuala Lumpur (High Commission)

 Muscat (Embassy)

 Islamabad (High Commission)

 Ramallah (Representative Office)
 Gaza City (Representative Office)

 Manila (Embassy)

 Doha (Embassy)

 Riyadh (Embassy)
 Jeddah (Consulate-General)

 Singapore (High Commission)

 Seoul (Embassy)

 Colombo (High Commission)

 Damascus (Embassy)

 Taipei (Liaison Office of the Republic of South Africa)

 Bangkok (Embassy)

 Ankara (Embassy)

 Abu Dhabi (Embassy)
 Dubai (Consulate-General)

 Hanoi (Embassy)

Europe

 Vienna (Embassy)

 Brussels (Embassy)

 Sofia (Embassy)

 Prague (Embassy)

 Copenhagen (Embassy)

 Paris (Embassy)

 Berlin (Embassy)
 Munich (Consulate-General)

 Athens (Embassy)

 Budapest (Embassy)

 Dublin (Embassy)

 Rome (Embassy)

 The Hague (Embassy)

 Oslo (Embassy)

 Warsaw (Embassy)

 Lisbon (Embassy)

 Bucharest (Embassy)

 Moscow (Embassy)

 Madrid (Embassy)

 Stockholm (Embassy)

 Bern (Embassy)

 Kyiv (Embassy)

 London (High Commission)

Oceania

 Canberra (High Commission)

 Wellington (High Commission)

Multilateral organisations

 African Union
Addis Ababa (Permanent Mission to the African Union)

Brussels (Mission to the European Union)

Geneva (Permanent Mission)
New York City (Permanent Mission to the United Nations)
Nairobi (Permanent Mission to the United Nations and other international organisations)
Vienna (Permanent Mission the United Nations)

Paris (Permanent Mission to UNESCO)

Gallery

References

See also 
 Foreign relations of South Africa
 List of diplomatic missions in South Africa

Notes

External links
 Department of Foreign Affairs of the Republic of South Africa
 Details of diplomatic missions of South Africa

 
Diplomatic missions
South Africa